Stanisława Umińska (17 November 1901 – 25 December 1977) was a Polish theatre actress.

Born in Warsaw, in early 1920s she was considered one of the rising stars of the Polish theatre, but in 1924 in Paris, France, she shot dead her dying fiance, artist , upon his request as an act of euthanasia. Set free by the French court, she became a nurse and a nun in Poland. She died in Niegów, Poland on Christmas Day in 1977.

Selected filmography
 Pan Twardowski (1921)

References
 Stanisława Umińska
 Małgorzata Szeroczyńska, Eutanazja i wspomagane samobójstwo na świecie. Studium prawnoporównawcze

1901 births
1977 deaths
Polish film actresses
Polish silent film actresses
20th-century Polish Roman Catholic nuns
Polish nurses
20th-century Polish actresses
Actresses from Warsaw
People from Warsaw Governorate